The Friendship Match is a term used by media and both football clubs for games between Polish football clubs Lechia Gdańsk and Śląsk Wrocław. While there have been longer "friendships" in Polish football, such as Polonia Warsaw and Cracovia having relations since the 1920s and officially since the 1960s, their decision to end their friendship agreement in 2017 meant that the agreement between Lechia and Śląsk became the longest current friendship in Polish football. The Friendship has officially been in place since 1977, with the friendship linking back to 1976. The friendship came into fruition in 1976 after Śląsk Wrocław fans traveled to northern Poland to watch Śląsk play against Gwardia Koszalin, a team who has strong links with Arka Gdynia, the main rival of Lechia Gdańsk. During meetings between the two clubs there is no segregation between fans, as in normal football matches, with both sets of fans often being involved with displays of banners and tifo.

Teams

Lechia Gdańsk
Founded in 1945 in Gdańsk after the expulsion of Poles in Lviv. Throughout their history they have mostly played in the top three tiers. The club had to restart in the lowest divisions after the club created a new club independent club a few years after the Lechia-Polonia Gdańsk merger in 2001. The team have been playing in the Ekstraklasa since 2008. The club have currently won the Polish Cup and the Polish SuperCup twice, winning both cups in 1983 and 2019. The team's highest position in the Ekstraklasa is third which it achieved in 1956 and 2019.

Śląsk Wrocław
Founded in 1947 in Wrocław, Śląsk have been the more successful of the two teams, playing mostly in the top division since the 1960s. Śląsk last won promotion to the Ekstraklasa in 2008 and have been in the league since. Śląsk have won the Polish championship twice in 1977 and 2012, and finishing in either second or third a further six times. They have won the Polish Cup twice, the Polish SuperCup twice, and the Ekstraklasa Cup once.

Three Kings of Great Cities

The Three Kings of Great Cities alliance was created in 1994 when Wisła Kraków formed an agreement with Śląsk Wrocław. Lechia and Wisła already had an agreement which dated back to 1973, with the two teams splitting from that agreement at least once. The friendship between the three teams was created to combat the large "The Great Triad", the alliance between Arka Gdynia, Cracovia and Lech Poznań. The alliance ended in 2016 with Wisła Kraków intending to form a friendship with Ruch Chorzów. This upset both Lechia and Śląsk fans as fans of Ruch Chorzów and Widzew Łódź were involved in the murder of a Śląsk fan in 2003. The main Lechia Gdańsk fan group posted that the decision for Wisła to form a friendship with Ruch was unacceptable for the fans of Lechia, and that the friendship was to be terminated. The main Śląsk Wrocław fan group posted a similar response the following day officially ending the TKWM alliance.

The Friendship Match

Games before 1977 were normal fixtures between the two clubs. Those from 1977 are from when the fans of both clubs agreed a friendship, with the modern term of these games being called "Mecz Przyjaźni", The Friendship Match.

Key

League

Cup Competitions

Players & Managers

Players

There have been a few players who have played for both Lechia Gdańsk and Śląsk Wrocław, with the majority of those playing for both clubs after the agreement which was made in 1977.

Bolesław Błaszczyk – Lechia (1980–1982) & Śląsk (1985)
Tomasz Borowiec – Lechia (2000) & Śląsk (1999)
Piotr Bubiłek – Lechia (2000) & Śląsk (2001)
Michał Chrapek – Lechia (2015–2017) & Śląsk (2017–2020)
Marcin Ciliński – Lechia (1995–1996) & Śląsk (1997–1998)
Jan Erlich – Lechia (1978–1981) & Śląsk (1974–1978)
Piotr Jacyna – Lechia (2000) & Śląsk (1995)
Marcin Janus – Lechia (1995, 2005–2006) & Śląsk (1999–2001)
Jerzy Kasalik – Lechia (1975–1976) & Śląsk (1969–1970)
Jakub Kosecki – Lechia (2011–2012) & Śląsk (2017–2018)
Aleksandar Kovačević – Lechia (2015–2017) & Śląsk (2017)
Kamil Kowalczyk – Lechia (1995–96, 1996) & Śląsk (1994)
Maciej Kowalczyk – Lechia (2008–2009) & Śląsk (2000–2001)
Grzegorz Krysiak – Lechia (2000) & Śląsk (1999)
Mateusz Lewandowski – Lechia (2017–2019) & Śląsk (2017, 2018)
Mateusz Machaj – Lechia (2011–2013) & Śląsk (2014–2016)
Michał Mak – Lechia (2015–2019) & Śląsk (2017–2018)
Sebastian Mila – Lechia (1997–1998, 1998–2001, 2015–2018) & Śląsk (2008–2015)
Tomasz Moskal – Lechia (2000) & Śląsk (1994–1997)
Flávio Paixão – Lechia (2016–present) & Śląsk (2014–2016)
Marco Paixão – Lechia (2016–2018) & Śląsk (2013–2015)
Jacek Paszulewic – Lechia (1998) & Śląsk (2001)
Bartłomiej Pawłowski – Lechia (2014–2017) & Śląsk (2020–2021)
Wojciech Pawłowski – Lechia (2010–2012) & Śląsk (2014–2015)
Mirosław Pękala – Lechia (1985–1988) & Śląsk (1977–1984)
Krzysztof Rusinek – Lechia (1998, 1998–2001, 2004–2006) & Śląsk (2007)
Krzysztof Sadzawicki – Lechia (1995–1996) & Śląsk (1999–2001)
Grzegorz Szamotulski – Lechia (1993) & Śląsk (2001)
Adam Tokarz – Lechia (1973–1974) & Śląsk (1967–1969)
Tomasz Unton – Lechia (1988–1994, 1995–96) & Śląsk (1997)
Dariusz Wojciechowski – Lechia (2001) & Śląsk (1996–1997)
Łukasz Zwoliński – Lechia (2020–present) & Śląsk (2016–2017)
Dzidosław Żuberek – Lechia (2000) & Śląsk (1998–1999)

Notes

Managers

Currently there have been three managers who have managed both Lechia Gdańsk and Śląsk Wrocław.

Zygmunt Czyżewski – Lechia (1945–1946) & Śląsk (1960–1961)
Wojciech Łazarek – Lechia (1974–1975, 1985–1986) & Śląsk (1998–1999)
Romuald Szukiełowicz – Lechia (2000) & Śląsk (1989–1991, 1995–1996, 2015–2016)

Notes

See also 

 Football in Poland
 Lechia Gdańsk
 Śląsk Wrocław
 Football hooliganism in Poland
 List of derbies in Poland

References 

Sport in Gdańsk
Sport in Wrocław
Lechia Gdańsk
Śląsk Wrocław